Cyperus kaessneri is a species of sedge that is native to eastern Africa.

The species was first formally described by the botanist Charles Baron Clarke in 1906.

See also
 List of Cyperus species

References

kaessneri
Taxa named by Charles Baron Clarke
Plants described in 1906
Flora of Tanzania
Flora of Kenya
Flora of Eritrea
Flora of Ethiopia